Clostridium hydrogeniformans is a Gram-positive, anaerobic, hydrogen-producing, spore-forming and motile bacterium from the genus Clostridium which has been isolated from groundwater in the United States.

References

 

Bacteria described in 2010
hydrogeniformans